Bukovina is a geographical region in Romania and Ukraine.

Bukovina may also refer to:

 Bukovina District, a subdivision of the Habsburg Monarchy and the Austrian Empire from 1774 to 1849
 Duchy of Bukovina, a crown land of the Austrian Empire and Austria-Hungary from 1849 to 1918
 Bukovina Governorate, a governorate of the Kingdom of Romania from 1941 to 1944
 Bukovina (Blansko District), a municipality and village in the Czech Republic
 Bukovina, Liptovský Mikuláš District, a municipality and village in Slovakia
 Bukovyna Stadium, a stadium in the Ukrainian part of Bukovina (in Ukrainian)
 Bukovyna, Ukrainian newspaper in Bukovyna, in 1885–1918

See also
 Bucovina (band), a Romanian band
 Bucovăț (disambiguation)
 Bukowina (disambiguation)